Hans Hermann Junge (11 February 1914 – 13 August 1944) was a German SS officer who served as aide-de-camp and valet to Adolf Hitler. He was married to Traudl Junge, Hitler's last private secretary. He was killed in combat during the latter stages of the Battle of Normandy in August 1944 and is buried in Champigny-Saint-André German war cemetery.

Career

Junge was born in Preetz in Schleswig-Holstein Province in February 1914. He joined the Schutzstaffel (SS) and in 1934 volunteered for the 1st SS Division Leibstandarte SS Adolf Hitler. On 1 July 1936, he became a member of the Führerbegleitkommando, which provided security protection for Hitler. In 1940, Junge became a valet and orderly to Hitler and met Traudl Humps, who was Hitler's last private secretary. Junge was considered Hitler's second valet after Heinz Linge. Junge worked as a valet in the Reich Chancellery in Berlin and at Hitler's residence near Berchtesgaden. According to Traudl, although they were called valets, the two men were really managers of Hitler's household. They accompanied him wherever he went and were in charge of Hitler's daily routine; including waking him, providing newspapers and messages, determining the daily menu/meals and wardrobe. Linge and Junge would trade shifts every two days.

With the encouragement of Hitler, Junge and Humps married on 19 June 1943. On 14 July 1943, he joined the Waffen-SS. About Junge's going to the front, his wife Traudl wrote in her memoirs:

The following year, he died in combat as an SS-Obersturmführer (first lieutenant) in a low flying aircraft attack in Dreux, France. According to Lehmann and Carroll, "Hitler had liked Hans Junge and was so upset by his death that he broke the news to Traudl Junge personally." Traudl stated that Hitler asked her to stay on as his secretary. He promised to "look after" Traudl now that she was a widow.

Notes

References

Citations

Bibliography
 
 
 
 

1914 births
1944 deaths
Personal staff of Adolf Hitler
SS-Obersturmführer
Burials at Champigny-Saint-André German war cemetery
Waffen-SS personnel killed in action
Deaths by airstrike during World War II
Military personnel from Schleswig-Holstein